South Carolina Highway 65 (also called Ocean Blvd, abbreviated SC 65) is a  state highway in the U.S. state of South Carolina. It is the main thoroughfare through North Myrtle Beach. The highway is known for the origin of the official state dance, the Carolina shag.

Route description
SC 65 begins at U.S. Route 17 (US 17) in North Myrtle Beach, near Atlantic Beach. It travels southeast along 27th Avenue South, heading one block towards the shoreline before turning northeast at South Ocean Boulevard, paralleling the ocean and shoreline businesses for the next , including an intersection with Main Street.  At the intersection with South Carolina Highway 9, SC 65 ends within the community of Cherry Grove Beach.

History

South Carolina Highway 69

South Carolina Highway 69 (SC 69) was a state highway that was established in 1977 from U.S. Route 17 (US 17) in Atlantic Beach, up to Cherry Grove Beach, and then back to US 17. In 1981, it was decommissioned and redesignated as SC 65. Today, its northernmost portion is part of SC 9.

Major intersections

See also

References

External links

SC 65 at Virginia Highways' South Carolina Highways Annex

065
Transportation in Horry County, South Carolina
Myrtle Beach metropolitan area
South Carolina culture